Jyotsna Yagnik is a retired Indian judge and academic.

Naroda Patiya massacre judgement 
Yagnik delivered a 1900-page judgement in Naroda Patiya massacre case in 2012 in Gujarat and sentenced 32 people to life in prison including former Gujarat Minister and Bharatiya Janata Party leader Maya Kodnani. Kodnani was sentenced to 28 years in jail. Others sentenced included Bajrang Dal leader Babu Bajrangi.

Views on death penalty
Yagnik did not award the death penalty, stating that it undermines human dignity.

Aftermath of the judgement
Yagnik received death threats after the verdict. She was given Z-category security. A man was arrested for making threats.

Judge in other notable cases
Yagnik awarded life sentence to 5 persons in a high-profile gang rape case in 2008. She has presided over other important trials involving rape or attempt to rape minor girls including one who was intellectually disabled.

Academic career
Yagnik has worked as pro vice-chancellor (and dean of School of Law and Justice) of Adamas University, and as faculty at Gujarat Forensic Sciences University, Raksha Shakti University and Nirma University.

References 

Living people
20th-century Indian women judges
20th-century Indian judges